Erik Hugo Mellbin (30 June 1901 – 30 October 1955) was a Swedish sailor. He was a crew member of the boat Elsie that won the silver medal in the 40 m² class at the 1920 Summer Olympics.

References

1901 births
1955 deaths
Swedish male sailors (sport)
Sailors at the 1920 Summer Olympics – 40m2 Skerry cruiser
Olympic sailors of Sweden
Olympic silver medalists for Sweden
Olympic medalists in sailing
Medalists at the 1920 Summer Olympics
Sportspeople from Gothenburg